Augustus Frederic Christopher Kollmann (21 March 1756 – 19 April 1829) was a German-born composer and musical theorist.

Life

Augustus Frederic Christopher Kollmann was born in Engelbostel, near Hanover on 21 March 1756.
His father was an organist and schoolmaster.
His brother George Christoph became a well-known organist at Hamburg.
He studied for two years in the second class of the Hannover Lyceum between about 1770 and 1772.
In 1772 he moved up to the first class of the Lyceum.
He was taught by Johann Christian Böttner (1731–1800), from Thuringia, who inspired him with a love of Bach.
In 1779 he was admitted to an academy for schoolmasters, where he learned a systematic method of teaching that he applied afterwards when acting as a musical tutor.
In 1781 he was appointed organist and schoolmaster at the Protestant convent, or school for noble ladies, at Lüne.

In 1782 Kollmann moved to England.
On 17 September 1782 he began work at the Royal German Chapel in London.
He was given the position of chapel-keeper of the German Chapel on 9 April 1784, and was to remain in this position for the rest of his life.
King George III presented a chamber organ to the chapel in 1792, and Kollmann played this instrument as "clerk" of the chapel until his death.
When there was a fire in the palace in 1809, he is said to have physically prevented the firemen from entering the chapel to destroy it. 
Kollmann seems to have been a founding member of the New Musical Fund, established on 16 April 1786.  
He served as a member of the fund for the remainder of his life.

Kollmann died in London on 19 April 1829. He was succeeded by his son George Augustus Kollmann and his daughter Johanna Sophia Kollmann who died in 1849.

His obituary in the Literary Gazette said: "No one could be more esteemed by all who knew him, through the course of a long life, than was this distinguished author. His memory, however, will live in his works, which may be designated as the Encyclopedia of Musical Science."

Work

In 1799 the leading musical periodical of the day published a diagram created by Kollmann in the form of a "sun of composers". Johann Sebastian Bach was at the center, the man from whom all true musical wisdom proceeded, surrounded by George Frideric Handel, Carl Heinrich Graun and Joseph Haydn, and they in turn were surrounded by other composers.
Kollman composed a piano concerto, chamber music and songs.
He published "The shipwreck, or the Loss of the East Indiaman Halsewell", an orchestral symphony, 
commemorating the 1786 loss of the Halsewell in which about 170 people drowned.

Kollmann published treatises on musical theory that build on those of Johann Kirnberger, and take the music of Johann Sebastian Bach as the basis.  These include An Essay on Musical Harmony (1796) and An Essay on Practical Musical Composition (1799).
In An Essay on Musical Harmony he said that, when playing alone, "the organ and other keyed instruments should be unequally tempered, though not so much as some tuners do, as to produce chords which are really offensive."
In An Essay on Practical Musical Composition he argued that a concert could represent a confrontation between the parts, 
as in C.P.E. Bach's "A Conversation between a Cheerful Man and a Melancholy Man."
He was the first to completely disregard the alternation between tutti and solo as the basis for a concerto's organisation, 
replacing it with a harmonic formula.

A friendly reviewer of his A Practical Guide to Thorough Bass (1801) began, "This work, the utility of which will be 
obvious to every musical reader, is conducted in that methodical and systematic plan for which all Mr. Kollmann's didactic publications are distinguished."
Kollmann wrote and compiled an edition of the  Quarterly Musical Register that was published on 1 January 1812.
Some sources say he may have been the translator of the work published in London in 1820 as On Johann Sebastian Bach's Life, Genius and Works, from the 1802 work in German of Johann Nicolaus Forkel.
This is incorrect.

Family

Kollmann married in 1783. He and his wife Christina had two children. Joanna Sophie was born on 20 July 1786 
and George Augustus was born on 30 January 1789, when his mother was 43 years old. 
Joanna first sang in public on 13 March 1806, performing a "scena" by Mozart at a New Musical Fund concert. 
Her last recorded performance was on 24 June 1811 at a performance to raise money for Portuguese who had suffered from the Peninsular War.

Kollmann's son George succeeded him in 1829 as "Organist, Clerk and Chapel Keeper of His Majesty's German Lutheran Chapel St James's'." 
That year the Royal Academy exhibited a bust of Kollmann by Joseph Kendrick, 
whose family was musical and had been friendly with the Kollmanns. 
In 1834 the Royal Academy exhibited a painting of Joanna Kollmann by Kendrick's daughter Emma.
George died from kidney disease on 19 March 1845.
Joanna succeeded him as chapel-keeper.  She died in May 1849.

Bibliography

References

Sources

External links
 

German composers
English composers
British music theorists
1756 births
1829 deaths